San Pedro de Tatara (aka San Pedro-Pellado) is a volcano in Chile.

See also 
 List of volcanoes in Chile

External links
 San Pedro de Tatara in OVDAS website

Volcanoes of Chile
Stratovolcanoes of Chile
Active volcanoes
Volcanoes of Maule Region